The Burlington Magazine is a monthly publication that covers the fine and decorative arts of all periods. Established in 1903, it is the longest running art journal in the English language. It has been published by a charitable organisation since 1986.

History
The magazine was established in 1903 by a group of art historians and connoisseurs which included Roger Fry, Herbert Horne, Bernard Berenson, and Charles Holmes. Its most esteemed editors  have been Roger Fry (1909–1919), Herbert Read (1933–1939), and Benedict Nicolson (1948–1978).  The journal's structure was loosely based on its contemporary British publication The Connoisseur, which was mainly aimed at collectors and had firm connections with the art trade. The Burlington Magazine, however, added to this late Victorian tradition of market-based criticism new elements of historical research inspired by the leading academic German periodicals and thus created a formula that has remained almost intact to date: a combination of archival and formalist object-based art historical research juxtaposed to articles on collectors’ items and private collections, enlivened with notes on current art news, exhibitions and sales. The lavishness of this publication almost immediately created financial troubles and in January 1905 Fry embarked on an American tour to find sponsorship to assure the survival of the journal, which he had quickly recognized as a magazine for the developing study of art history.

Content
From its first editorial, The Burlington Magazine presented itself as synthesising opposing traditions – historicist versus aestheticism and academic versus commercial – by defining itself an exponent of "Austere Epicureanism". Against the perceived "sameness" of the contemporary art panorama, The Burlington Magazine was to act as a disinterested guide, directing the public's attention to high-quality art on offer both on the market and on institutional settings and educating its readers on the elevating qualities of ancient art. The Burlington Magazine editors and contributors were part of the institutional sphere of museums and academia and yet, unlike their German counterparts, they participated in the emerging world of the commercial galleries. The magazine remained independent from any institution and yet it was instrumental in the establishment of academic art history in Britain: its dialectical dynamic between market and institution contributed to the creation of an original and multifaceted publication.

The Burlington Magazine was founded as a journal of ancient art but already in its first decade, especially under the editorship of Fry articles on modern art became prominent. Topics covered in detail were: Paul Cézanne and Post-Impressionism in a debate between Fry and D. S. MacColl, a debate on a bust of Flora ascribed to Leonardo da Vinci and later discovered to be a forgery, and the role of archival research in the art historical reconstruction, with contributions by Herbert Horne and Constance Jocelyn Ffoulkes.

The Burlington Magazine, especially in its first decades, was also preoccupied with the definition and development of formal analysis and connoisseurship in the visual arts and consistently observed, reviewed and contributed to the body of attributions to various artists, notably Rembrandt, Poussin, and Caravaggio. The journal had also many notable contributions by visual artists on other artists, notably Walter Sickert on Edgar Degas.

Production
The journal is published monthly, and features a cross-section of writers.

The first issues of The Burlington Magazine were printed on high-quality paper, had a typeface designed by Herbert Horne and were richly illustrated with black and white photographs, many by the arts and crafts photographer Emery Walker.

Editors 
 Robert Dell: March–December 1903
 Charles Holmes and Robert Dell: January 1904–October 1906
 Charles Holmes: October 1906– September 1909
 Harold Child Assistant Editor with the advice of a Consultative Committee: October and November 1909
 Roger Fry and Lionel Cust: December 1909–December 1913
 Roger Fry, Lionel Cust, and More Adey: January 1914–May 1919
 John Hope-Johnstone: July 1919–December 1920
 Robert R. Tatlock: Early 1921–1933
 Herbert Read: 1933–1939
 Albert C. Sewter: 1939–40
 Tancred Borenius: 1940–1944
 Edith Hoffmann (Assistant Editor who ran the Magazine with advice from Read): 1944–45
 Ellis Waterhouse acting editor (the magazine was officially without an editor): 1945–1947
 Benedict Nicolson:  1947–July 1978
 Editorial Board of Directors:  August–October 1978
 Terence Hodgkinson: November 1978–August 1981
 Neil MacGregor: September 1981–February 1987
 Caroline Elam: March 1987–July 2002
 Andrew Hopkins: August 2002–December 2002
 Richard Shone and Bart Cornelis (joint editors): January 2003–March 2003
 Richard Shone: March 2003–September 2015
 Frances Spalding: September 2015–August 2016
 Jane Martineau: acting editor August 2016 to May 2017
 Michael Hall: May 2017 to present

References

External links 
 
Examples of articles
Online books page

History magazines published in the United Kingdom
Monthly magazines published in the United Kingdom
Magazines established in 1903
Magazines published in London
Visual arts magazines published in the United Kingdom
Art history journals